The Good Student, also known as Mr. Gibb, is a 2006 American dark comedy drama film starring Tim Daly and Hayden Panettiere.

Plot
Mr. Ronald Gibb is a high school history teacher, whose life has fallen apart - he is reportedly widowed, living in a messy trailer-home, and largely uncaring about life. Although he is depicted as a creative if weak-willed teacher, his students lack interest for the subject matter. One of his students, Ally Palmer, is a popular cheerleader, and a local celebrity, after being featured in a television commercial for her father's car dealership.

Mr. Gibb has a not-so-secret crush on Ally (other students, and the school janitor, have noted it). He often stares at her inappropriately. One day after school, he overhears Ally and her boyfriend Brett get into a big argument, and they break up. She no longer has a ride home from school, so he offers to take her home. Mr. Gibb and Ally are photographed (by one photography-wise student who was aware of his crush) just as she spontaneously kisses him on the lips (to thank him for giving her an unexpected A), and as such the school board deems his behavior unacceptable and unprofessional; he is suspended from his teaching position.
Ally goes missing after Mr. Gibb dropped her off at her house. The news reports that a kidnapping has occurred. Mr. Gibb is the primary suspect because police officials find evidence that he was with Ally moments before she was kidnapped. Considerable public attention is focused on the kidnapping, and the girl's unscrupulous father takes advantage by tying a large sales drive to the missing girl. The film follows Gibb as he copes with public humiliation and ends with a sudden twist in the final minutes. The apparently innocent teacher is seen in a new light, but many questions remain unanswered.

Cast
 Tim Daly as Ronald Gibb, the high-school teacher
 Hayden Panettiere as Allyson "Ally" Palmer, the kidnapped student
 William Sadler as Phil Palmer, the girl's father ("Honest Phil" in his TV ads)
 Dan Hedaya as Gabriel "Gabe", the school janitor
 Paula Devicq as Holly Cooper, a neighbor who sees Mr. Gibb as a romantic possibility
 John Gallagher, Jr. as Brett Mullen, Allyson's boyfriend
 Sarah Steele as Amber Jinx, the photography-wise student
 Brian Anthony Wilson as Detective Dick Moon
 Andrew Benator as Kari
 Rita Gardner as Marge Whitman
 Mark Kassen as Pete Macauley
 Sadler Colley Bakst as Caroline
 Lisa Lynds as Tiffany "Tiff"
 Maureen Mueller as Evelyn Hirsch

Production
The story is based in Poughkeepsie, New York, and some of the footage was filmed there, including Poughkeepsie Middle School and Vassar College. The film was released in 2006 with an R rating for theatrical distribution, at 1:30 length. It was released for TV use in 2008 with an apparently gratuitous nude scene removed and a 1:19 runtime.

Reception
The movie received mixed reviews. As of 2022, it holds a 4.8/10 rating on movie aggregator IMDb, and a 40% rating on Rotten Tomatoes.

References

External links
 
 
 Mr. Gibb, New York Times
 "Alumni", The Canadian Film Centre

2006 films
2006 comedy-drama films
American comedy-drama films
2006 directorial debut films
2000s English-language films
2000s American films